A mi edad may refer to:

Alla mia età, album by Tiziano Ferro with a Spanish version named A mi edad
"Alla mia età", the title song from the album